Eric Prince (11 December 1924 – 2003) was an English footballer who played in the Football League for Port Vale in the mid-1940s.

Career
Prince played for Ipstones; the local village club, before joining Port Vale in September 1944. He scored on his debut; a 2–1 defeat by West Bromwich Albion at The Hawthorns in a Football League North match on 9 September. He was a regular for the "Valiants" during the war years, but also guested for Crewe Alexandra in March 1945. He scored twice in 18 games during the 1946–47 season, scoring against Aldershot and Brighton & Hove Albion at The Old Recreation Ground in late December. He featured in just three Third Division South matches in 1947–48, before he was released by manager Gordon Hodgson in February 1948. He moved on to Macclesfield Town, and later turned out for Simplex Creda.

Career statistics

References

People from Ipstones
English footballers
Association football forwards
Port Vale F.C. players
Macclesfield Town F.C. players
English Football League players
1924 births
2003 deaths